Benjamin Cortus (born 13 December 1981) is a German football referee who is based in Röthenbach. He referees for TSV Burgfarrnbach of the Bavarian Football Association.

Refereeing career
Cortus officiates for TSV Burgfarrnbach, and has been on the DFB level since 2009. In 2011, he was appointed as a 2. Bundesliga referee. In the summer of 2016, Cortus was one of four referees promoted to officiate in the Bundesliga.

Personal life
Cortus is an IT management assistant by trade, and currently resides in Röthenbach.

References

External links
 Benjamin Cortus at DFB 
 
 
 

1981 births
Living people
Sportspeople from Nuremberg
German football referees